Management Research & Development Center is a research center within the National Iranian Petrochemical Company (NIPC). It was established in 2002 and does such activities as training, project management research, publication and so on. The Center provides training courses in cooperation with local universities.
This center is located within the office complex of the NIPC in the Haftetir district of Tehran.

References

External links
 PMIR website

Research institutes in Iran